The Interlake Steamship Company is an American freight ship company that operates a fleet on the Great Lakes in North America. It is now part of Interlake Maritime Services.

The company is chaired by James R. Barker, with his son, Mark W. Barker, serving as President. Paul R. Tregurtha serves as Vice-Chairman of the company.

History
The firm was founded in 1913 when a consortium of firms bought out the seventeen vessels of the Gilchrist Company, which had gone into receivership. The other firms were: the Lackawanna Steamship Company, the Acme Steamship Company, the Standard Steamship Company, the Provident Steamship Company and the Huron Barge Company. The combined fleet operated 56 vessels.

When Interlake launched its largest vessel, MV William J. Delancey (now MV Paul R. Tregurtha), its fleet contained 151 vessels, and was capable of carrying over three million tons of cargo at one time.

In early 2018, Interlake established a subsidiary service known as Interlake Logistics Solutions. Although its existing freight services were focused on bulk raw materials, the new service offered shipping of finished goods.

The vessel, to be built by Fincantieri Bay Shipbuilding in Sturgeon Bay, Wisconsin, was the first ship built for the U.S.-flagged Great Lakes fleet since 1983, and the first built by Interlake since 1981. Named MV Mark W. Barker, the ship was christened on 1 September 2022.

In December 2020,  was acquired by the Interlake Steamship Company. The deal also included acquisition of the tug  (renamed MT Undaunted), deck barge  (renamed ATB Pere Marquette 41), and SS Badger sister ship , currently not in operation. This was a part of a larger sale of assets. The Middleburg Heights, Ohio-based Interlake Holding Company acquired the assets of Lake Michigan Car Ferry Company, based in Ludington, Michigan.

List of vessels

References

External links
 Interlake Steamship Company 

Interlake Maritime Services
Interlake Maritime Services subsidiaries
Transport companies established in 1913
Shipping companies of the United States
American companies established in 1913
Great Lakes Shipping Companies
Great Lakes